The 2023 Dunlop Series is an ongoing Australian motor racing competition for Supercars as a support series. It is the twenty-fourth running of the Supercars Development Series, the second tier of competition in Supercars racing. Since joining as a class in 2021 this marks at the same time as the sixteenth running of the Super3 Series, the third tier of competition in Supercars racing (Officially in 2019 as the Kumho Tyre Super3 Series).

It will be the first year, Super2 class will run the Gen2 cars (Holden Commodore ZB and Ford Mustang GT). Super3 class will run the older Project Blueprint and Car of the Future vehicles.

Teams and drivers

Classes

Entry list

Team Changes

Super2 
Anderson Motorsport will return to the Super2 Series after purchasing an ex-Dick Johnson Racing Mustang.

Brema Group Racing will switch from driving a single Holden Commodore VF, to an ex-Tickford Racing Ford Mustang GT.

Triple Eight Race Engineering will withdraw from the Super2 Series, to focus on Supercars and GT programs.

Blanchard Racing Team announced they would run a Super2 program for the first time in 2023, in preparation for expanding to a second car in the Supercars Championship.

Tickford Racing will be expanding to a two-car team.

Matt Stone Racing will withdraw from the Super2 Series, in order to focus resources on their Supercars program.

Walkinshaw Andretti United announced they would run a Super2 program for the first time since Nick Percat finished 4th in 2012, running two Holden ZB Commodores.

MW Motorsport will switch from their Nissan Altima L33s to an ex-Tickford Racing Ford Mustang GT.

Matt Chahda Motorsport will switch from a Ford FG X Falcon to an ex-Brad Jones Racing ZB Commodore.

Super3

Driver changes

Super2 
Kai Allen will remain with Eggleston Motorsport in Super2 after graduating from Super3 Series. He will be joined by 2020 Porsche Carrera Cup Australia champion Cooper Murray and Australian Formula Ford Championship driver Jordyn Sinni.

Porsche Carrera Cup Australia driver Aaron Love will become Blanchard Racing Team’s first Super2 driver.

Cameron McLeod, grandson of 1987 James Hardie 1000 race winner Peter McLeod, graduated to Super3 from Australian Formula Ford driving a Nissan Altima L33.

Elly Morrow will switch from Brad Jones Racing to Tickford Racing in Super2.

2022 Super3 champion Brad Vaughan will make his Super2 debut at Tickford Racing.

Zach Bates graduated from the Toyota 86 Racing Series to join Walkinshaw Andretti United.

Aaron Seton will switch from Matt Stone Racing to Gommersall Motorsport in Super2.

Super3

Calendar

Results and Standings

Results

Super2

Super3

Standings

Super2